Leslie Ascott (October 2, 1921 – August 8, 2013) was a professional football player with the Canadian Football League Toronto Argonauts for 11 seasons.  Ascott primarily played the offensive tackle position with the Argos and was a part of five Grey Cup championship teams.

In 1981 Ascott was inducted into the Peterborough Sports Hall of Fame.

In a 2004 ceremony at Rogers Centre, Ascott's jersey number 52 was retired and his name was added to the Argonauts' Wall of Honour.

Ascott lived in Peterborough, with his wife of 50 years, Irene. He had two children, Terry and Barbara, and three granddaughters. He died August 8, 2013 in his hometown.

References

External links 
Bio - Les Ascott

1921 births
2013 deaths
Canadian football offensive linemen
Toronto Argonauts players
Players of Canadian football from Ontario